Murrayfield is an affluent area to the west of Edinburgh city centre in Scotland. It is to the east of Corstorphine and north of Balgreen and Roseburn. The A8 road runs east–west through the south of the area. Murrayfield is often considered to include the smaller neighbouring areas of Ravelston (to the north) and Roseburn (to the south).

History
The name comes from the estate of Archibald Murray who built Murrayfield House for himself in 1735 on the south-facing slopes over the area. Archibald Murray bought the land from Nisbet of Dean in 1733; it was previously Nisbet's Park. Alexander Murray, Lord Henderland was born here the year after its construction. Much of the Murrayfield area was semi-rural up until the early 19th century. Among mansion houses built then was Belmont House in 1828 by architect William Playfair for Lord Mackenzie and a large villa known as Rock Villa (later Rockshiel) appears on the Ordnance Survey Map of 1855. The OS map from the 1890s suggests this area remained spacious with scattered individual houses and villas throughout the nineteenth-century.

Easter Belmont Road (a private road), is one of Edinburgh's "Millionaire's Rows" and is home to local businessman David Murray. Aside from sports facilities, there is much residential land use and a private hospital, Spire Murrayfield Hospital, part of the Spire Healthcare group. There are also a few shops, businesses and hotels.

Sports 
Murrayfield is known for Murrayfield Stadium, home to the Scottish national rugby union team and venue for many sporting events. In the shadow of the stadium is Murrayfield Ice Rink, which currently hosts the Edinburgh Capitals ice hockey team and previously played host to the famous Murrayfield Racers. In the 2006-07 season, Heart of Midlothian played their UEFA Champions League ties at Murrayfield. Murrayfield Stadium has also been the venue for some large concerts.

In addition to the stadium, there are Murrayfield Lawn Tennis Club and Murrayfield golf course which is between Ravelston and Corstorphine Hill. The tennis club was founded in 1904 as The West Edinburgh Tennis and Croquet Club. Murrayfield Golf Club was founded in 1896 and its initial membership was limited to '300 gentlemen and 200 ladies'; in 1904 it was laid out on Ravelston Estate west of Murrayfield Road. Murrayfield Golf Club is notable for having been a mixed club from the start with female members having the same rights and privileges as the men.

Schools
The well-known independent schools, St. George's School for Girls and the Merchant Company of Edinburgh's The Mary Erskine School for girls are situated in the Murrayfield area.

The local primary school for most is Roseburn Primary School and Murrayfield is part of the Craigmount High School catchment area. The nearest Roman Catholic schools are Fox Covert R.C. Primary School and St. Augustine's High School.

Notable residents
 Chris Hoy grew up on the boundary of Corstorphine and Murrayfield.

References

Further reading
 Bell, Raymond MacKean Literary Corstorphine: A reader's guide to West Edinburgh, Leamington Books, Edinburgh 2017
 Cant, Michael, Villages of Edinburgh volumes 1 & 2, John Donald Publishers Ltd., Edinburgh, 1986-1987.  & 
 Cosh, Mary Edinburgh the Golden Age (2003), Birlinn, Edinburgh
 Grant, James, Old and new Edinburgh''' volumes 1–3 (or 1–6, edition dependent), Cassell, 1880s (published as a periodical): Online edition
 Harris, Stuart (1996). The Place Names of Edinburgh. Edinburgh: Gordon Wright Publishing. p. 144. .
 Sherman, Robin Old Murrayfield and Corstorphine'' (2003)

External links 

Bartholomew's Chronological map of Edinburgh (1919)
Murrayfield Community Council

Areas of Edinburgh